USS Honolulu (SSN-718), was a , and the third ship of the United States Navy to be named for Honolulu, Hawaii. The contract to build her was awarded to Newport News Shipbuilding and Dry Dock Company in Newport News, Virginia on 15 September 1977 and her keel was laid down on 10 November 1981. She was launched on 24 September 1983 sponsored by Mrs. Joan B. Clark, and commissioned on 6 July 1985, with Commander Robert M. Mitchell in command.

Honolulu featured unique split stern planes that operated from independent hydraulic systems. With this redundant configuration, the inboard and outboard planes could be operated independently, preventing a failure of one or the other from causing an uncontrolled dive.

Honolulus patrols were commemorated by ten surfboards signed by the crews aboard her at the time.  The latest three were kept on board the submarine; the other seven are stored at Pearl Harbor.

Honolulu held a farewell ceremony in Pearl Harbor on 15 April 2006, that included remarks by Senator Daniel K. Inouye, Lieutenant Governor Duke Aiona, U.S. Pacific Fleet commander Admiral Gary Roughead and former Honolulu commanding officer Vice Admiral Jonathan Greenert.  Honolulu put to sea in early May 2006 for her final patrol. Her last patrol ended at Puget Sound Naval Shipyard in October 2006 where she was placed on stand down, on her way to decommissioning.

Disposition

Honolulu was decommissioned and stricken from the Naval Vessel Register on 2 November 2007. Ex-Honolulu entered the Nuclear Powered Ship and Submarine Recycling Program in Bremerton, Washington.

Despite difficulties, the unusual project was completed on 20 October 2008.

In fiction and literature
Although it had already been decommissioned, the submarine is featured prominently in the 2008 naval thriller, Black Sea Affair, by Don Brown.

References

External links 

 
 USS Honolulu Command History 1981-1987 

Los Angeles-class submarines
Cold War submarines of the United States
Nuclear submarines of the United States Navy
1983 ships
Ships built in Newport News, Virginia